Hypselobarbus keralaensis is a species of cyprinid in the genus Hypselobarbus.

References

Cyprinidae
Cyprinid fish of Asia
Fish of India